Riders of the Sky is a Czechoslovak movie directed by Jindřich Polák in 1968 about Czechoslovak pilots in No. 311 Squadron RAF service during the Battle of Britain, and the ongoing aerial battle in northern Europe.

Production
The movie is based on the 1964 novel Nebeští jezdci by Czech World War II RAF and Soviet Air Force air gunner Richard Husmann, writing as Filip Jánský. In 1969 Hodder & Stoughton published an English translation of the book as Riders in the Sky. The name of the book was inspired by a country song Riders in the Sky by American songwriter Stan Jones. The song can be heard in the movie.

It was filmed at Klecany military airfield north of Prague, English park at Dobříš Chateau, Prague hospital U Apolináře and Rügen island in Germany.

Some of the ariel shots were from a 1941 documentary film Target for Tonight.

Cast
Jiří Bednář as Sgt. Malý, nicknamed "Študent"
Jiří Hrzán as Sgt. Novák, nicknamed "Prcek"
Svatopluk Matyáš as Pilot Pavel Kolár
Elsie Randolph as Nurse Henderson
Charles Cameron as Bradley
Jana Nováková as Patricia Watkinson, WAAF member
Joan Seton as Watkinson's mother
Winston Chrislock as Navigator Tommy
Vojtěch Holý as Navigator George
Josef Váša as Second pilot Frank

Release
The movie premiere took place in Kolín on November 15, 1968. Several members of Czechoslovak RAF Squadrons were present, including Air Marshal Karel Janoušek, KCB. The film was released to distribution on December 20, 1968, but in February 1969 it was banned.

Reception
Nebeští jezdci is often referred as the best Czech war film.

See also
Dark Blue World - 2001 Czech movie about Czechoslovak WWII pilots

References

External links

  - Fansite of the movie

 

Battle of Britain films
Czech resistance to Nazi occupation in film
1960s Czech-language films
Czech war drama films
Czechoslovak war films
Films directed by Jindřich Polák
Slovak-language films
Czech World War II films
Czech aviation films